Michael Hamilton Morgan  is a political scientist and a novelist and non-fiction author from the US. He wrote a book named Lost History and Arabia: The Golden Ages.

Professional career
Michael Hamilton Morgan is a novelist and nonfiction author. His book Lost History: the Enduring Legacy of Muslim Scientists, was translated into various languages including Arabic, Indonesian and Korean.

Books 
Lost History: the Enduring Legacy of Muslim Scientists, This book has been translated into various languages including Arabic, Indonesian and Korean.
 Arabia: In Search of the Golden Ages Published in fall 2010 by Insight Editions
Collision with History: the Search for John F. Kennedy’s PT 109 This book and TV documentary was released by National Geographic and MSNBC in 2002.

References

University of Virginia alumni
University of Virginia faculty
20th-century American writers
21st-century American writers
1951 births
Living people